Samuel Locke Sawyer (November 27, 1813 – March 29, 1890) was a U.S. Representative from Missouri.

Born in Mont Vernon, New Hampshire, Sawyer was graduated from Dartmouth College, Hanover, New Hampshire, in 1833. He studied law, and was admitted to the bar in Amherst, New Hampshire, in 1836. He moved to Lexington, Missouri, in 1838 and continued his law practice.

Sawyer was elected circuit attorney of the sixth judicial circuit of Missouri in 1848 and reelected in 1852. He served as delegate to the Missouri constitutional convention in 1861. He served as delegate to the Democratic National Convention in 1868. Sawyer was elected judge of the twenty-fourth judicial circuit and served from 1871 until February 15, 1876, when he resigned.

Sawyer was elected as an Independent Democrat to the Forty-sixth Congress (March 4, 1879 – March 3, 1881). He did not seek renomination in 1880, and returned to the practice of law and engaged in banking. He died in Independence, Missouri, March 29, 1890, and was interred in Woodlawn Cemetery.

References

1813 births
1890 deaths
People from Mont Vernon, New Hampshire
Members of the United States House of Representatives from Missouri
Dartmouth College alumni
Missouri Independents
Missouri Democrats
Independent Democrat members of the United States House of Representatives
19th-century American politicians